Milton Keynes was a borough constituency represented in the House of Commons of the Parliament of the United Kingdom  from 1983 until 1992.

It covered much of the then recently created Borough of Milton Keynes in Buckinghamshire, including the new town of Milton Keynes itself (including older settlements such as Bletchley) together with Newport Pagnell, Olney and the rural area to the north of Milton Keynes.

History 
The Borough of Milton Keynes was established in 1974 by the Local Government Act 1972, seven years after the new town was first designated.  Before 1983, the Borough was part of the Buckingham constituency;  however, its population had expanded to such an extent that the new constituency of Milton Keynes was created for the 1983 general election.  It comprised the Borough of Milton Keynes, except for the wards of Stony Stratford, Wolverton and Wolverton Stacey Bushes, which were retained by Buckingham.

The sitting Buckingham MP, William Benyon of the Conservative Party, was elected for the new seat, and was its only ever MP.

Uniquely outside the normal cycle of periodic reviews by the Boundaries Commission, Milton Keynes was split into two constituencies for the 1992 general election: North East Milton Keynes and Milton Keynes South West.

Boundaries
The Borough of Milton Keynes wards of Bradwell, Church Green, Danesborough, Denbigh, Eaton, Fenny Stratford, Lavendon, Linford, Loughton, Manor Farm, Newport Pagnell, Newton, Olney, Pineham, Sherington, Stantonbury, Whaddon, Woburn Sands, and Woughton.

Members of Parliament

Elections

References

Sources
United Kingdom Election Results

Parliamentary constituencies in Buckinghamshire (historic)
Constituencies of the Parliament of the United Kingdom established in 1983
Constituencies of the Parliament of the United Kingdom disestablished in 1992
Politics of Milton Keynes